Hafjell is a village and a ski resort in Norway, in the Øyer municipality in the county of Oppland.

Hafjell hosted the alpine skiing technical events (giant slalom and slalom) at the 1994 Winter Olympics; the speed events were held at Kvitfjell, a regular stop on the World Cup tour for men's speed events in March.  Hafjell occasionally hosts World Cup slalom and giant slalom races, last in 2006 (women) and 1996 (men's and women's finals).

Hafjell Bike Park

Hafjell Bike Park is renowned as the best Bike Park for downhill riding in Norway and some of the bike trails have a vertical drop of 830 m, varies in difficulty with jumps and drops for the ”nut balls” and easier lines for the beginners.

Since its early inception in 2001, Hafjell Bike Park has exploded into a world class Bike Park. It started with the “Wednesday Club”, a group of local riders doing shuttle runs in the area that soon became tired of blasting down the Hafjell fire-roads and craved more demanding trails. In Feb, 2002 a meeting between Snorre Pedersen and the manager of Hafjell Alpine Centre, Geir Olsen occurred, resulting in support from Hafjell Alpine Centre, ending the Illegal trail building.

Snorre Pedersen is the architect of the Park, and is described as a magician with bike trails, and back in 2003 he started as a pioneer, digging and constructing the NC-trail, together with the help of volunteers putting in hundreds of hours of manual labour. Hafjell did on this trail later host a National Downhill race in 2004. This was the start of the designing and transforming of the hills of Hafjell, and this turned it into a true paradise for the downhill enthusiasts.

Altogether 14 trails are now carved into the alpine wooden landscape. Whether you prefer downhill, cross-country or trail riding, Hafjell can make your biking better through its gondola and lift accessed mountain biking experience.

The name
Until 1930 the name was written "Avfjellet" on maps. The first element is av 'off', the last element is fjell n 'mountain'. The meaning is 'the mountain broken off a larger mountain' (the top of Hafjell lies beneath the larger and taller mountain Nevelfjell, and it could be considered to be a part of this). The first element was pronounced just as [a:], and the h was later added (see h-adding) to emphasize it.

Events
The venue hosted the Alpine skiing events during the 2016 Winter Youth Olympics.

References

1994 Winter Olympics official report. Volume 3. pp. 42–6.

External links
Hafjell official website - 
Hafjell Booking  - 
Hafjell.no - official Summer site - 
hajfjellbikepark.no - Hafjell Bike Park site
Snow-forecast.com - Hafjell
storm.no - weather forecast

Venues of the 1994 Winter Olympics
Venues of the 2016 Winter Youth Olympics
Olympic alpine skiing venues
Ski areas and resorts in Norway
Øyer